Elachista bidens is a moth of the family Elachistidae that is found in Western Australia.

The forewings are blue. The hindwings are grey.

The larvae feed on Lepidosperma tuberculatum. They mine the leaves of their host plant. Pupation takes place outside of the mine on a leaf of the host plant.

References

Moths described in 2011
Endemic fauna of Australia
bidens
Moths of Australia
Taxa named by Lauri Kaila